Blue Planet Eyes is the debut studio album by Australian rock band the Preatures, released on 30 September 2014 through Mosy Recordings and Universal Music Australia.

Blue Planet Eyes debuted and peaked at number 4 on the ARIA Albums Chart and was certified gold in 2018. The single version of the song "It Gets Better", retitled as "Better Than It Ever Could Be", was featured in the online setlist for Guitar Hero Live in 2015.

The album includes their 2013 breakthrough single, "Is This How You Feel?".

Track listing

Charts

Year-end charts

Certifications

References

2014 debut albums
The Preatures albums
Albums produced by Jack Moffitt (musician)
Albums produced by Jim Eno
Mercury Records albums